Amorphophallus longispathaceus is a species of corpse flower, of the genus Amorphophallus, native to the southern island of Mindanao in the Philippines and the northern island of Borneo in Indonesia. It produces a tall, single, compound leaf on a thick, fleshy stalk from a big, bowl-shaped tuber.

Gallery

References

longispathaceus
Flora of the Philippines